Jones Hill may refer to:

 Jones Hill, Queensland, a place in Australia
 Jones Hill Wood, in Buckinghamshire, England
 Jones Hill, Pennville, Indiana, U.S.
 Jones Hill (Massachusetts), a mountain in Dukes County, Massachusetts, U.S.
 Jones Hill, early name of Avon Hill Historic District, Cambridge, Massachusetts, U.S.
 Jones Hill, a neighborhood of Dorchester, Boston, Massachusetts, U.S.
 Jones Hill (Daniels County, Montana), a mountain in Daniels County, Montana, U.S.
 Jones Hill (Stillwater County, Montana), a mountain in Stillwater County, Montana, U.S.
 Jones Hill, an elevation near Columbia, New York, U.S.
 Jones Hill, Jamestown, New York, U.S.
 Jones Hill, early name of Corolla, North Carolina, U.S.
 Jones Hill Summit (Morrow County, Oregon), a mountain pass in Oregon, U.S.

See also
W. J. Hill (William Jones Hill, 1834–1888), an English actor, singer and comedian
John Paul Jones hill, highest point of Guantanamo Bay Naval Base, Cuba